One and All: The Best of Cherish the Ladies, an album by Cherish the Ladies, was released in 1998 on the Green Linnet label.

Track listing
 "The Cat Rambles to the Child's Saucepan/Maire O'Keefe/Harry Bradshaw's" – 3:20
 "The Cameronian Set: Tha M'Intinn Raoir/Duke of Gordon/The Cameronian/Lady of the House" – 5:26
 "The Green Cottage Polka/Jer O'Connell's/Tom's Tavern" – 3:06
 "Broken Wings" – 5:16
 "Declan's Waltz/Waltz Duhamel" – 3:28
 "A Neansaí Mhíle Grá" – 5:30
 "Highway to Kilkenny/The Boys of Portaferry/The Abbey Reel/Ashmaleen House" – 3:38
 "Three Weeks We Were Wed" – 3:04
 "O'Keefe's/The Shepherd's Lamb/Johnny O'Leary's" – 3:31
 "Green Grow the Rushes Oh" – 4:48
 "Jessica's Polka/Tear the Calico/I Have No Money" – 4:08
 "The Back Door" – 4:23
 "Crowley's Reels/Tom Ward's Downfall" – 3:17
 "My Own Native Land" – 4:00
 "Joe Ryan's Barn Dance Set: The New Broom/Joe Ryan's Barn Dance/St. Ruth's Bush/The Penny Candle" – 5:32

References

Cherish the Ladies albums
1998 compilation albums